Paula McGee (born December 1, 1962)  is an American  preacher, writer, inspirational speaker and former basketball player. She played college basketball for the University of Southern California where she won the NCAA championship in 1983 and 1984. Paula is the twin sister of former WNBA player and Olympic gold medalist Pamela McGee.

College career
McGee joined USC in 1980 and averaged 20.0 points and 9.0 rebounds per game as a freshman. She was a 1982 WBCA All-American, 1983 Kodak All-American, 1983 and 1984 NCAA Final Four All-Tournament Team and a four-time WCAA First Team All-Conference.

Professional career
McGee started her professional career in 1984, when she and her sister played together for the Dallas Diamonds in the Women's American Basketball Association. She went on to play professionally until 1992.

References

1962 births
Living people
African-American basketball players
All-American college women's basketball players
American women's basketball players
Basketball players from Flint, Michigan
Identical twins
Parade High School All-Americans (girls' basketball)
Forwards (basketball)
American twins
Twin sportspeople
USC Trojans women's basketball players
21st-century African-American people
20th-century African-American sportspeople
20th-century African-American women
21st-century African-American women